Elaborations of Carbon is the debut album of the band YOB.

Track listing

Personnel 
 Mike Scheidt – vocals, guitar
 Isamu Sato – bass guitar
 Gabe Morley – drums

External links
Elaborations of Carbon @ Encyclopaedia Metallum

2002 debut albums
Yob (band) albums